"Pilot" is the pilot episode and series premiere of the FX television series Sons of Anarchy. It was written by series creator Kurt Sutter, and directed by Alan Coulter and Michael Dinner. It originally aired in the United States on September 3, 2008, and garnered 2.5 million viewers.

Plot
One night in Charming, California, a motorcycle gang called the Mayans break into a warehouse to steal a shipment of automatic weapons. Mayans leader Marcus Álvarez orders the warehouse to be destroyed. Jax Teller, the vice-president of the Sons of Anarchy Motorcycle Club - Redwood Original (SAMCRO), witnesses the resulting explosion.

The next morning, at the site of the explosion, Sheriff Vic Trammel  who is on SAMCRO's payroll  tells club president Clay Morrow that the warehouse was destroyed by arson, showing him the bodies of two women who were hiding beneath the building. Clay instructs Trammel to set up a meeting with the One-Niners, an East Bay street gang who buy weapons from SAMCRO. One-Niners leader Laroy Wayne, who needs SAMCRO's guns to cover for an incoming shipment of heroin, gives Clay more time to replace the lost weapons.

Meanwhile, Jax has moved to SAMCRO's clubhouse after splitting up with Wendy Case, his pregnant ex-wife who is addicted to methamphetamine. Looking in his parents' garage, Jax finds old photographs of his father John, as well as a journal written for Jax detailing the history of the club. Juice Ortiz has traced the stolen guns to the Mayans in San Leandro.

Jax's mother Gemma Teller Morrow, finds Wendy unconscious, necessitating her being hospitalized and her baby being delivered ten weeks premature via caesarean section. She takes her to the hospital and calls Jax. Dr. Tara Knowles tells him that the baby has a heart defect which, combined with Wendy's drug abuse, gives him just a 20% chance of living. He later asks his best friend and lapsed club member Opie Winston to come along on the approaching raid on the Mayans' warehouse. Opie, an explosives expert, only reluctantly agrees as he was recently released from a five-year prison sentence after being caught during a similar raid.

Jax suggests that SAMCRO look into other ways of earning money, but Clay prioritizes retrieving their stolen weapons. Later, Clay tells Jax that he can't be "getting cold feet" about the club, telling him that he and John sacrificed a lot to build SAMCRO. Jax tells Gemma about John's journal, in which his father stated that SAMCRO has strayed away from his original vision of social rebellion. That night, Gemma tells Clay to stop Jax's new found mode of thinking.

The next day, the club members discuss the recent parole of Ernest Darby who leads the Nordics, a white supremacist gang of meth dealers. Clay, Jax and Bobby Munson later meet up with Darby at a diner, and warn him to keep his drug dealing out of their town.

At the hospital, Tara recommends that Abel's heart surgery happens immediately, and asks to privately talk to Gemma. The two argue, with Tara claiming she's a different person to how she was 10 years ago.

That night, Jax goes to Opie's house to bring him along on the raid and finds that his wife Donna is angered because Opie is again involved with the club. Jax tells Opie to stay with his family, and makes an excuse to Clay that one of his children had an accident that needed his attention.

In San Leandro, Clay, Jax, Tig and Chibs Telford have ridden into town and they soon find the Mayans' stash of guns and heroin. However, after they break into the warehouse, a group of guards show up and Clay and Chibs shoot and kill the first few, leaving one that Clay forces Jax to kill. The man was white and had a swastika tattoo, implying that he is a Nord. Jax is hesitant to kill the man, implying that he truly is getting cold feet about the club, and Clay eventually does it when the Nord reaches for a gun. The group then use explosives to blow up the stash, and the corpses in the process, before riding back to Charming.

Tara performs a successful surgery on Abel and Gemma visits Wendy, ridiculing her and telling her that the district attorney is dropping any charges against her. Wendy says that she will get clean, now that she has her baby. Gemma threatens her, saying that if she tries to get custody of the child, she will kill her. Gemma then gives back the bible Wendy was reading, now containing a needle. Jax also returns to the hospital, and reunites and embraces with Tara. Wendy has an overdose in her hospital bed.

Production
Originally, Scott Glenn was cast in the role of Clay Morrow and an entire pilot episode was filmed with him. However, series creator Kurt Sutter decided to go in a different direction with the character and re-cast Ron Perlman in the role, and Clay's scenes were re-shot. Additionally, Emilio Rivera was originally cast as a Sons of Anarchy club member named "Hawk," who eventually evolved into the character of Tig Trager. Also, the One-Niners street gang who buy weapons from SAMCRO first appeared in The Shield, which Sutter produced.

Reception
IGN gave the pilot a 7.2/10 rating, stating, "At first blush, Sons of Anarchy is not nearly as assured or gripping as The Shield. Charlie Hunnam is excellent as Jackson, and Perlman and Sagal are great as usual. The show looks good, the dialogue occasionally crackles and the story has rich possibilities. However, the show rides very close to being self-parody. While Jackson might be having second thoughts about the Sons lifestyle – the show itself is certainly in love with the bikes, the guns, and the brutality. This isn't good enough to recommend without reservation – but if you need to get your manliness on- this might be just the thing."

References

External links

2008 American television episodes
Sons of Anarchy
Sons of Anarchy episodes
Television episodes directed by Allen Coulter